Scolecoseps boulengeri, also known commonly as Boulenger's limbless skink, is a species of lizard in the family Scincidae. The species is endemic to Mozambique.

Etymology
The specific name, boulengeri, is in honor of Belgian-born British herpetologist George Albert Boulenger.

Geographic range
S. boulengeri is found along the coast of Mozambique in Cabo Delgado Province and Nampula Province.

Reproduction
The mode of reproduction of S. boulengeri is unknown.

References

Further reading
Loveridge A (1920). "Notes on East African Lizards collected 1915–1919, with Description of a new Genus and Species of Skink and new Subspecies of Gecko". Proceedings of the Zoological Society of London 1920: 131–167. (Scolecoseps boulengeri, new species, pp. 159–160 + Text-figure 1).

boulengeri
Reptiles of Mozambique
Reptiles described in 1920
Taxa named by Arthur Loveridge